Padgham is a surname. Notable people with the surname include:

Alf Padgham (1906–1966), English golfer
Hugh Padgham (born 1955), English record producer and audio engineer
Noel Padgham-Purich (born 1927), Australian politician